Ayub Medical College (Urdu, Hindko: , , or AMC) is a leading public medical institute located in Abbottabad, Pakistan. It is one of the medical colleges affiliated to Khyber Medical University. AMC is home to 1,500 students in the MBBS and BDS programs, with clinical rotations at Ayub Teaching Hospital. Faculty members hold appointments at basic sciences and clinical departments. There are 212 full-time faculty members: lecturers, assistant professors, associate professors and professors.

History 
In the late 1960s, a government study concluded that more medical colleges were needed in Pakistan to improve medical education, research, and healthcare in the country. In particular, Khyber Pakhtunkhwa was in dire need of health reforms - a decision was thus made in 1972 to construct another medical college outside of the Peshawar region. In 1975, four cities were shortlisted for the site of the new college; Abbottabad, Dera Ismail Khan, Mingora and Chitral. A decision was made in 1978 to build the new college in Abbottabad and on 9 May 1979, classes started at Ayub Medical College. The first batch consisting of 100 students (class of 1984) was accommodated at the Education Extension Centre, while the present college campus and teaching hospital were later on constructed north of the town. On 30 December 1990, the new campus opened its doors to students and faculty. Abbottabad District Headquarters Hospital remained affiliated to Ayub Medical College upon opening of Ayub Teaching Hospital in 1998. AMC was named after former President Ayub Khan, who hailed from nearby Haripur. The first Principal of AMC was Dr. Abdul Jamil Khan. Today AMC hosts one of the largest medical college campuses in Pakistan.

Academics

The Bachelor of Medicine and Bachelor of Surgery is awarded to students after five professional years of theoretical and clinical training. AMC features 24 clinical and 8 basic science departments with 212 full-time faculty members involved in teaching, patient care, and advancing medical knowledge through scholarly clinical and basic science research. Annually, AMC educates and trains approximately 1000 medical students along with 200 resident physicians and fellows. In addition to offering the MBBS degree, AMC offers a BDS degree for dental students. In 2010, AMC introduced Community Oriented Medical Education (COME), a form of problem-based learning in a bid to convert from the annual system to a semester system. However, the transition has been slow and faced a lot of problems regarding its acceptance and experienced by the teachers and the taught.
Graduates are eligible to apply for a medical license from the Pakistan Medical and Dental Council following the completion of the degree and one year of house job at a teaching hospital.

Undergraduate programs 
 Bachelor of Medicine & Bachelor of Surgery (MBBS)
 Bachelor of Dental Surgery (BDS)
 Bachelor of Science in Nursing (BScN)

Postgraduate programs 
 Fellow of College of Physicians & Surgeons Pakistan (FCPS)
 Member of College of Physicians & Surgeons Pakistan (MCPS)

Recognition 
AMC is fully recognized by the Pakistan Medical and Dental Council (PMDC). The College of Physicians and Surgeons of Pakistan has recognized many of its departments for post-graduate training in Medicine, Surgery, Obstetrics & Gynaecology, Oral & Maxillofacial Surgery and Pathology. The Royal College of Obstetricians and Gynaecologists of Britain has granted recognition to the Department of Obstetrics and Gynaecology at AMC for clinical training of MRCOG candidates.

Departments 

 Basic sciences
 Anatomy
 Physiology
 Biochemistry
 Pharmacology
 Forensic Medicine
 Pathology
 Community Medicine
 Medical Education

 Medicine and allied departments
 General Medicine
 Pediatrics
 Behavioural Sciences
 Cardiology
 Dermatology
 Neurology
 Psychiatry
 Radiotherapy
 Urology
 Social & Preventive Medicine

 Surgery and allied departments
 General Surgery
 Obstetrics and Gynaecology
 Orthopedics
 Ophthalmology
 Otorhinolaryngology
 Cardiac Surgery
 Thoracic Surgery
 Pediatric Surgery
 Anesthesiology
 Neurosurgery
 Radiology

 Dentistry and allied departments
 Oral Biology and Tooth Morphology
 Chemistry of Dental Materials
 Dental Anatomy
 Dental Pharmacology
 Oral Pathology
 Community/Preventive Dentistry
 Oral and Maxillofacial Surgery
 Orthodontics
 Oral Medicine
 Periodontology
 Prosthodontics

Attached hospitals
 Ayub Teaching Hospital (1998–present)
 District Headquarters Hospital, Abbottabad (1979–1998)

Institutes, schools and centers
 Abbottabad Physiotherapy Institute
 AMI Paramedical Institute
 Ayub College of Dentistry
 School of Nursing at Ayub Teaching Hospital
 Institute of Nuclear Medicine, Oncology and Radiotherapy (INOR)

Campus 
The  campus consists of a medical school, teaching hospital, nursing school, dental school and paramedical institute with supporting amenities for all students and staff. The campus is also home to the Abbottabad CPSP Regional Centre and the Institute of Nuclear Medicine, Oncology and Radiotherapy.

Medical school
The medical school building has four air-conditioned, spacious lecture halls with sophisticated audiovisual teaching aids, well-equipped laboratories and museums.

Teaching hospital

Dental school

Nursing school

The Ayub School of Nursing is the nursing education unit at AMC, however, most teaching and training occurs at Ayub Teaching Hospital.

Library
The library provides various learning resources for both students and faculty. There are three main sections of the library - the main hall, a reading room, and a self-learning resource center. The main hall houses a collection of over 10,000 medical books along with various medical journals including the Journal of Ayub Medical College or JAMC. The reading room is separated from the main hall by a glass partition and is mainly used by faculty members - it also houses the office of the chief librarian. The self-learning resource center consists of 20 computers with access to the Digital Library of the Higher Education Commission.

Accommodations
The campus also provides hostel accommodation for up to 500 medical students, 300 internees, 100 nurses, and a colony comprising 10 flats for non-teaching staff. The hostels are named after famous Pakistani personalities and regions.

Sports complex
A sports complex including the PCB-AMC stadium for cricket and hockey ground has also been built.

Research

Journal of Ayub Medical College
The Journal of Ayub Medical College (J Ayub Med Coll, Abbottabad, JAMC, p-ISSN 1025-9589, e-ISSN 1819-2718, NLM ID: 8910750) is published by the Faculty of Ayub Medical College since January 1988 and has been indexed by Index Medicus, Medline, Pubmed, Index Copernicus, Index Pakistan, PakMediNet and WHO EMRO besides many other indexing agencies. It is also recognized by Pakistan Medical and Dental Council as a 'Standard Medical Journal' and placed in category 'X' by the Higher Education Commission of Pakistan. This makes it only the second medical journal in Pakistan to have been indexed and published worldwide. It is a peer-reviewed journal and has gained its place as a standard medical journal globally. JAMC is the first medical journal available with illustrations FREE online.

Administration
 Dean and CEO: Umer Farooq
 Vice-Dean: Naseer Ahmad
 Vice-Dean (Dentistry): Iram Abbas
 Associate Dean (Undergraduate): Ashfaq Ahmad
 Associate Dean (Research ): Ruqiyya Sultana
 Associate Dean(postgraduate): Alamzeb Khan Swati

Former Principals/Deans

Student life 
Students and alumni of Ayub Medical College are referred to as Ayubians. Many partake is the various societies and clubs the college offers. Some societies which are medical-oriented are governed by professors along with an associate society master who serves as "academic advisers" to students. Other societies are strictly governed by students. Students unions and political student bodies are banned from AMC. Due to its unique "crossroad" location, Ayub Medical College is one of the most ethnically diverse campuses in Pakistan with students from various backgrounds including, Balochs, Pashtuns, Hindkowans, Chitralis, Punjabis, Saraikis, Kashmiris, Kalash, Burusho, Shina and Baltis.

Societies and clubs

Publications 
Karakoram is the annual college magazine published at Ayub Medical College and maintained by the Ayubian Literary Society.

Alumni 
 Anam Najam, physician and psychiatrist
 Ayub Medical College Alumni Association of North America
 AMC Alumni Association Europe

See also
 Ayub Teaching Hospital
 Institute of Nuclear Medicine, Oncology and Radiotherapy
 Ayub School of Nursing
 Education in Pakistan

References 

 (PHY-993) Use of the M. D. Title: The Wisconsin Medical Society: 1) defends the use of the M.D. title by physicians who graduated with an M.B.B.S. and are licensed to practice medicine in Wisconsin. (HOD,0495)

External links
 

Khyber Medical University
 Medical colleges in Khyber Pakhtunkhwa
1979 establishments in Pakistan
Universities and colleges in Abbottabad
 Public universities and colleges in Khyber Pakhtunkhwa